Kadia Kumbhar / Kadiya Kumbhar are a Hindu sub-group of the Kumbhar caste, which are found only in Gujarat, India. They are among the Socially and Educationally Backward Classes of Gujarat State.

The Kadia Kumbhar caste originated in the 1920s, when a group decided to break links with the Kumbhar, their parent caste and form a new distinct sub-group.
Kadia Kumbhars are those who have taken to the occupation of Kadias, or masons. Remarriage of divorcees and widows is accepted in the Kadia Kumbhar society. Marriage between individuals of close relation is prohibited. They are mostly vegetarian in diet but some members, especially in South Gujarat, do eat non-vegetarian food.

Before India gained independence, the Kadia Kumbhar sub-group was largely concentrated in the territory of the former Baroda State, Bhavnagar State and in the Diu territory of Portuguese India. The first census of the community was taken in the year 1931.  Presently, they are found spread in towns and districts like Vadodara, Amreli, Navsari, Kadi, Okha, Kodinar, Bhavnagar, and Mahuva, which towns were parts of these Princely States and Diu. The community living in Talaja, Bhavnagar call them Gurjar Kshatriya Kadia Kumbhar.

References

Social groups of Gujarat
Indian castes
Kumhar clans
Hindu communities